Julie E. Czerneda (born April 11, 1955) is a Canadian science fiction and fantasy author. She has written many novels, including four Aurora Award for Best Novel winners (In the Company of Others, A Turn of Light, A Play of Shadow, and The Gossamer Mage), and a number of short stories; she has also edited several anthologies.

Czerneda is a biologist by education, and has been active in writing and editing non-fiction. She has edited and authored a number of educational books about career guidance and the teaching of science. In 2022, Czerneda  was inducted into the Canadian Science Fiction and Fantasy Association Hall of Fame (CSFFA).

Works

Standalone books
 In the Company of Others (2001) – 
 The Gossamer Mage (2019) – 
 To Each This World (November 2022, DAW) –

Novellas 

 No Place Like Home (2016)

The Clan Chronicles
This continuity was formerly called the Trade Pact Universe.

Trade Pact trilogy
 A Thousand Words for Stranger (1997) – 
 Ties of Power (1999) – 
 To Trade the Stars (2002) –

Stratification trilogy
Prequel to the Trade Pact trilogy:
 Reap the Wild Wind (2007) – 
 Riders of the Storm (2008) – 
 Rift in the Sky (2009) –

Reunification series
 This Gulf of Time and Stars (2015) – 
 The Gate to Futures Past (2016) – 
 To Guard Against the Dark (2017) –

Species Imperative
Trilogy of biology, politics and survival in a multi-species, interstellar future. 
 Survival (2004) – 
 Migration (2005) – 
 Regeneration (2006) –

Esen
With the publication of Search Image, the Web Shifters trilogy is listed as part of the Esen continuity, which  features the adventures of the shape-shifter Esen-alit-Quar. A Carisian, a species which plays a significant role in the Clan Chronicles, also appears in Search Image, although there are no common plot points.

Web Shifters
 Beholder's Eye (1998) – 
 Changing Vision (2000) – 
 Hidden in Sight (2003) –

Web Shifter's Library
 Search Image (2018) – 
 Mirage (2020) – 
 Spectrum (2022) –

Night's Edge
 A Turn of Light (2013) – 
 A Play of Shadow (2014) – In 2014 Czerneda announced that DAW Books had bought the next three books in the series.
A Change of Place (announced)
A Fall of Darkness (announced)
A Twist of Magic (announced)

Contributor
 "Prism" (Web Shifters) in DAW 30th Anniversary Science Fiction Anthology, edited by Elizabeth R. Wollheim and Sheila E. Gilbert (2002) 
 ReVisions, edited by Julie E. Czerneda and Isaac Szpindel (2004) – 
 Sirius the Dog Star edited by Martin H. Greenberg and Alexander Potter (2004) – , "Brothers Bound" (prequel to the Stratification trilogy in the Clan Chronicles)
 "She's Such a Nasty Morsel" (Web Shifters) in Women of War edited by Alexander Potter and Tanya Huff (2005) – 
 "A Touch of Blue" (Web Shifters) in Heroes in Training, edited by Martin H. Greenberg and Jim C. Hines (2007) – 
 "The Passenger" in Lightspeed Science Fiction and Fantasy magazine, February 2011
 "The Franchise" in Space Stations edited by Martin H. Greenberg and John Helfers (sequel to In the Company of Others) –

Career guidance
 Great careers for people interested in living things (1993) – 
 Great careers for people who like to work with their hands (1994) – 
 Great careers for people interested in communications technology (1996) by Julie E. Czerneda and Victoria Vincent
 Great careers for people fascinated by government and the law (1996) by Anne Marie Males; contributing authors, Julie Czerneda and Victoria Vincent

Edited by Julie E. Czerneda
Space, Inc. (2003) – 
ReVisions with Isaac Szpindel (2004) – 
Tesseracts 15: A Case of Quite Curious Tales with Susan MacGregor (2004) – 
Fantastic Companions (2005) – 
 Mythspring: From the Lyrics and Legends of Canada (2006) with Genevieve Kierans – 
 Under Cover of Darkness with Jana Paniccia (2007) – 
 Misspelled (2008) – 
 Ages of Wonder with Rob St. Martin (2009) – 
Nebula Awards Showcase 2017 (2017) – 
The Clan Chronicles: Tales from Plexis (2018), anthology –

Science education through science fiction stories in the classroom
 No Limits: Developing Scientific Literacy Using Science Fiction (1998), non-fiction – 
 Packing Fraction & Other Tales of Science & Imagination (1998) –

Tales from the Wonder Zone
 Stardust (2001) 
 Explorer (2002) 
 Orbiter (2002) 
 Odyssey (2004) 
 Polaris: A Celebration of Polar Science (2007) .  Winner of the Canadian Science Writers' Award (Youth Book, 2007)

Realms of Wonder
 Summoned to Destiny (2004) 
 Fantastic Companions (2005)

Awards
 University of Waterloo Alumni of Honour Award 2007
 Golden Duck Awards
 2003 Special award for Best Science and Technology Education, given for the Tales of the Wonder Zone (entire series)
 Prix Aurora Award
 2002 Best Long Form in English for In the Company of Others
 2002 Best Short Form in English for "Left Foot on A Blind Man"
 2004 Best Editor for Space, Inc.
 2008 Best Editor for Under Cover of Darkness (with Jana Paniccia)
 Romantic Times
 2001 Reviewers' Choice Winner: Best Science Fiction Novel for In the Company of Others

See also
 List of University of Waterloo people

References

External links

 Official Site, run by the author
 
 In Other Worlds, a fan site
 Julie E. Czerneda on Fantastic Fiction
  list of Canadian SF writers
 Fantafiction a brief bio and bibliography
 Susan O'Fearna' Bookshelf a listing of publications (including short stories)
 Julie E. Czerneda on LibraryThing

1955 births
Living people
Canadian science fiction writers
Canadian fantasy writers
Canadian women novelists
Women science fiction and fantasy writers
20th-century Canadian novelists
21st-century Canadian novelists
20th-century Canadian women writers
21st-century Canadian women writers